Ronald D. Castille (born March 16, 1944) served on the Supreme Court of Pennsylvania from 1994 to 2014 and was chief justice from 2008 to 2014. He stepped down from the court in 2014, after reaching the mandatory retirement age of 70.

He was the District Attorney of the City of Philadelphia from 1986 until 1991 and is a member of the Republican Party.  He is also an amputee and requires the use of crutches after he lost his right leg to enemy gunfire while he was serving as a Marine platoon commander during the Vietnam War.

Marine Corps service
Castille received a B.S. in economics from Auburn University in 1966.  Following graduation was commissioned an officer in the United States Marine Corps in Vietnam, where he served as a platoon commander in 2nd Battalion, 7th Marines.  On March 16, 1967, Castille was conducting a search and destroy mission with his company in Duc Pho, Quang Ngai Province, when they came under attack from a Viet Cong battalion. During the fighting Castille was seriously wounded and fell, unable to move. One of his Marines, Angel Mendez, shielded him and then carried him to friendly lines, which were more than seventy-five meters away. During this action Mendez was hit in the shoulder, and two of his comrades rushed to help him with Castille, but Mendez refused to let go of Castille and chose to act as rear man. Mendez continued to shield his lieutenant with his own body until he was mortally wounded. For his actions Mendez was posthumously awarded the Navy Cross and promoted to sergeant.

Judicial career
Following his medical retirement from the Marine Corps in 1968, Castille received his J.D. from the University of Virginia School of Law. Moving to Philadelphia 1971, District Attorney Arlen Specter hired Castille as an assistant district attorney. He served in that capacity for 14 years, from 1971 to 1985, rising to be a deputy district attorney in 1983. In 1985 he was elected District Attorney of Philadelphia and served from January, 1986 through 1991, when he ran for Mayor of Philadelphia. He narrowly lost in the Republican primary to former Democratic Mayor Frank Rizzo by 47,523 votes (36.45%) to 46,094 (35.35%). Prior to his election to the Supreme Court, he was in private practice as a civil litigator for Reed Smith Shaw & McClay in Philadelphia. He was elected to the Supreme Court of Pennsylvania in 1993.

On January 14, 2008, Castille was sworn in as Chief Justice of Pennsylvania. He retired at the mandatory age of 70 on March 16, 2014. Castille was elected to membership in the American Law Institute in 2014.

While Chief Justice, in his capacity as head administrator of the Pennsylvania courts, he hired Jeffrey B. Rotwitt to act as the courts' attorney in a project to build a new family courthouse in Philadelphia County. Journalists at The Philadelphia Inquirer revealed that Rotwitt was simultaneously acting as a business partner of the construction project's developer and was therefore involved on both sides of the transaction. Castille later claimed to have been duped by Rotwitt.

In 2012, Castille, a Republican, cast the deciding vote against the Pennsylvania Legislative Reapportionment Commission's redistricting map, siding with his Democratic colleagues. In his opinion, Castille wrote that the map split too many municipalities. He also wrote the unanimous opinion upholding the LRC's revised redistricting maps in 2013.

As district attorney, Castille frequently sought the death penalty, a point he used during his campaign for the Supreme Court. Castille personally authorized seeking the death penalty against Terry Williams, who had killed two men who sexually abused him as a child, but the sentence was overturned 25 years later because the prosecution deliberately withheld key facts. Castille's Supreme Court reinstated the sentence in 2015. On June 9, 2016, the US Supreme Court concluded in Williams v. Pennsylvania, that "Chief Justice Castille's failure to recuse from Williams's case presented an unconstitutional risk of bias."

Awards and decorations
Among Ron Castille's awards and decorations are the following:
  Bronze Star  (with Combat Valor Device)
  Purple Heart
  Navy Presidential Unit Citation
  Navy Unit Commendation
  Combat Action Ribbon
  National Defense Service Medal
  Vietnam Service Medal
  Republic of Vietnam Gallantry Cross
  Vietnam Campaign Medal

See also

 Angel Mendez

Notes

References

 Official State of Pennsylvania Supreme Court profile

External links
 with Ron Castille by Stephen McKiernan, Binghamton University Libraries Center for the Study of the 1960s, July 16, 1997

1944 births
Living people
Justices of the Supreme Court of Pennsylvania
Chief Justices of Pennsylvania
District Attorneys of Philadelphia
American prosecutors
American amputees
Pennsylvania Republicans
United States Marine Corps personnel of the Vietnam War
United States Marine Corps officers
People from Miami
Auburn University alumni
University of Virginia School of Law alumni
American politicians with disabilities